Gard Steiro  (born 26 January 1976) is a Norwegian journalist and newspaper editor.

He grew up in Askøy. He was chief editor of the newspaper Bergens Tidende from 2012 to 2015. In 2017 he was appointed chief editor and publisher for the newspaper Verdens Gang.

References

1976 births
Living people
People from Askøy
Norwegian newspaper editors
Verdens Gang people
Bergens Tidende editors